The 2014 Michigan gubernatorial election took place on November 4, 2014, to elect the Governor of Michigan, concurrently with the election of Michigan's Class II U.S. Senate seat, as well as other elections to the United States Senate in other states and elections to the United States House of Representatives and various state and local elections.

Incumbent Republican Governor Rick Snyder ran for re-election to a second term in office. Primary elections took place on August 5, 2014, in which Snyder and former U.S. Representative Mark Schauer were unopposed in the Republican and Democratic primaries, respectively.

Snyder was considered vulnerable in his bid for a second term, as reflected in his low approval ratings. The consensus among The Cook Political Report, Governing, The Rothenberg Political Report, and Sabato's Crystal Ball was that the contest was a "tossup". Snyder was saddled with a negative approval rating, while his Democratic opponent, former U.S. Representative Mark Schauer, suffered from a lack of name recognition.

Despite concerns about his approval rating hurting his chances at victory, Snyder was re-elected with 50.9% of the vote. This is also the last time the Republican candidate won the counties of Kalamazoo and Oakland, and the last time the Democratic candidate won the counties of Alger, Baraga, and Manistee.

Republican primary
Polling indicated significant opposition from Republican primary voters in Michigan towards Snyder's bid for re-election. This came in the midst of discussions by the Tea Party network regarding whether incumbent lieutenant governor Brian Calley should be replaced as Snyder's running mate. Snyder started running campaign ads in September 2013, immediately following the Mackinac Republican Leadership Conference and formally declared that he is seeking re-election in January 2014.

In August 2013, Tea Party leader Wes Nakagiri announced that he would challenge Calley for the Republican nomination for lieutenant governor.  At the Mackinac Republican Leadership Conference (September 20–22, 2013), speculation reported by the media also included Todd Courser as a potential challenger to Calley.  At the Michigan Republican Party state convention, which took take place on August 23, 2014, incumbent lieutenant governor Brian Calley won renomination.

On January 3, 2014, Mark McFarlin (who had originally declared his intention to run as a Democrat the previous November), announced that he would be running for the Republican nomination. He believed that his populist platform was too conservative for the Democratic ticket, and that he could get crossover support in the general election. However, he did not submit his filing petitions in time to qualify for the August primary ballot.

Candidates

Declared
 Rick Snyder, incumbent governor of Michigan

Failed to qualify
 Mark McFarlin, private investigator and Independent write-in candidate for governor in 2002 (had declared as a Democrat, then switched parties)

Declined
 Mike Bishop, former Majority Leader of the Michigan Senate (running for Congress)
 Todd Courser, Tea Party activist, candidate for the Michigan Board of Education in 2012 and for chairman of the Michigan Republican Party in 2013

Polling

Results

Democratic primary
Michigan Democratic Party leadership rallied support behind former U.S. Representative Mark Schauer, who ran unopposed in the Democratic Party primary. Party Chairman Lon Johnson encouraged all other potential challengers to stay out of the race so as to avoid a costly and potentially bitter primary campaign. Conservative Democrat and "birther" Mark McFarlin had announced on November 29, 2013, that he was running for the Democratic nomination for governor, but he switched parties on January 3, 2014, leaving Schauer as the only candidate for the Democratic nomination.

Candidates

Declared
 Mark Schauer, former U.S. Representative
Running mate: Lisa Brown, Oakland County Clerk & Register of Deeds and former state representative

Withdrew
 Mark McFarlin, private investigator and Independent write-in candidate for governor in 2002 (ran as a Republican)

Declined
 John C. Austin, president of the Michigan Board of Education
 Vicki Barnett, Minority Whip of the Michigan House of Representatives
 Jocelyn Benson, dean of Wayne State University Law School and nominee for Michigan Secretary of State in 2010
 Virgil Bernero, Mayor of Lansing and nominee for governor in 2010
 Mark Bernstein, attorney and Regent of the University of Michigan
 Mike Duggan, Mayor-elect of Detroit and former Wayne County Prosecutor
 Mark Hackel, Macomb County Executive
 Dan Kildee, U.S. Representative
 Gary Peters, U.S. Representative (running for the U.S. Senate)
 Bart Stupak, former U.S. Representative
 Gretchen Whitmer, Minority Leader of the Michigan Senate

Polling

Results

Minor parties

Candidates

Libertarian Party
 Mary Buzuma, nominee for Michigan's 2nd congressional district in 2012
Running mate: Scott Boman, activist, former chairman of the Libertarian Party of Michigan and perennial candidate

Green Party
 Paul Homeniuk
Running mate: Candace Caveny, nominee for the state senate in 2006, 2008 and 2010 and nominee for the State Board of Education in 2012

U.S. Taxpayers Party
 Mark McFarlin, Independent write-in candidate for governor in 2002
Running mate: Richard Mendoza

Independents

Candidates

Declared
 Robin Sanders, retired from the United States Navy and the Michigan Department of Corrections

General election

Debates
Complete video of debate, October 12, 2014 - C-SPAN

Predictions

Polling

Results

See also

 2014 United States Senate election in Michigan
 2014 Michigan Attorney General election
 2014 Michigan Secretary of State election
 2014 United States gubernatorial elections
 2014 United States elections

References

External links
 Michigan gubernatorial election, 2014 at Ballotpedia

Official campaign websites (Archived)
 Mark McFarlin for Governor
 Robin Sanders for Governor
 Mark Schauer for Governor
 Rick Snyder for Governor incumbent

Gubernatorial
2014
2014 United States gubernatorial elections